Jack Frost–Big Boulder are two separate ski areas operated as one resort. It is located in Kidder Township, Carbon County, near White Haven, Pennsylvania, part of the Pocono Mountains region. Previously operated by Peak Resorts, it was purchased by Vail Resorts in 2019.

Big Boulder

Big Boulder opened in 1947 and employee John Guresh is credit with developing the first usable snow making equipment while working there in the 1950's. Big Boulder resort has three main parks, Big Boulder Park, LOVE Park (Inspired by Philadelphia's LOVE Park a popular destination for skateboarders), and Freedom Park, on certain weekends it can have more. Especially after a competition in which they create new terrain. During the 2020/21 ski season, Vail made the decision to considerably reduce the number of terrain parks at Big Boulder and market the mountain as a learning hill. It remains to be seen if this is a temporary COVID-19 pandemic related change or if Vail has decided to take away what made Boulder special when compared to today’s mega resorts. The resort has two lodges, the main lodge, which is located at the bottom of the mountain and can be seen from the parking lot. Inside there are cafes and other services for the snowboarders/skiers. The other lodge, located at the bottom of Big Boulder Park, is called the lower lodge. The lower lodge includes an outdoor grill, a bar a pro shop, and the entire lodge is sponsored by Red Bull Energy Drink.

Jack Frost

The owners of Big Boulder built Jack Frost with a longer runs and a higher vertical drop, going down to the level of the Lehigh River, rather than up to a ridge top.

Ecology

Jack Frost Ski Resort

According to the A. W. Kuchler U.S. potential natural vegetation types, Jack Frost Ski Resort would have a dominant vegetation type of Northern Hardwood's (106) with a dominant vegetation form of Northern hardwood forest (23). The spring bloom typically begins around April 30 and fall color usually peaks before October 11.

Big Boulder Ski Resort

According to the A. W. Kuchler U.S. potential natural vegetation types, Big Boulder Ski Resort would have a dominant vegetation type of Northern Hardwood (106) with a dominant vegetation form of Northern hardwood forest (23). The spring bloom typically begins around April 30 and fall color usually peaks before October 13.

Recreation

In 2006, warm weather resulted in issues for local skiers, but was able to stay open with snow reserves made in December.

The resort was able to open one week earlier due to an aggressive snow season.

Jack Frost is a major tourist destination and attraction in the region and has caused an influx of new home buyers. Home buyers have cited the ski resort, golf courses, and distance from New York City and Philadelphia as factors for purchasing local properties.

References

External links
Official site
Big Boulder Ski Area history

1972 establishments in Pennsylvania
Buildings and structures in Carbon County, Pennsylvania
Peak Resorts
Pocono Mountains
Ski areas and resorts in Pennsylvania
Tourist attractions in Carbon County, Pennsylvania